Maisie may refer to:
 Maisie (given name), also spelled Maisy, Maizie, Maysie or Mazie
 Maisie Ravier, an American film and radio show character
 Maisie (film), a 1939 American comedy film, the first in a series featuring Maisie Ravier
 Maisie (telemovie), a 1960 telemovie starring Janis Paige as Maisie Ravier

 "Maisie", a song by Syd Barrett from the 1970 album Barrett

See also
 Maisi (disambiguation)
 Maisy Series, a series of children's books by Lucy Cousins
 Maisy, a British TV series based on the book series
 Mazie (disambiguation)